Carlin's Cairn is a hill in the Rhinns of Kells, a sub-range of the Galloway Hills range, part of the Southern Uplands of Scotland. It is located immediately north of Corserine, the highest summit of the range. The eighth highest hill in southern Scotland, the commonest ascent is from Forrest Lodge to the east but it is also climbed as part of a traverse along the entire ridge.

References

Mountains and hills of the Southern Uplands
Mountains and hills of Dumfries and Galloway
Donald mountains